"Always Be Yours" is a song recorded by Australian singer-songwriter Nathaniel Willemse and fifth single from his debut studio album Yours. It was released on 9 October 2015.
The song was also an instant grat track upon pre-order of the album and the CD single was released on 30 October 2015.

Background and promotion
In January 2015, Willemse married his long-time girlfriend, model Fujan Erfanian on a tropical island in Langkawi, Malaysia. During an interview on The X Factor Australia, Nathaniel said he wrote and performed "Always Be Yours" for their wedding day.

Willies announced the release of the single via his Twitter account on 8 October.

Willemse performed "Always Be Yours" live on The X Factor Australia results show on 27 October 2015 and again at the 2015 Melbourne Cup which was televised on Sunrise.

Music video
The official video clip was released on 6 November 2015 via Willemse's VEVO account. It was directed by Nik Kacevski.

Review
In a review of the album Yours, Cameron Adams from the Herald Sun said "The deep ballad "Always Be Yours" is just waiting to soundtrack a love scene on Home and Away".
Jackie Smith of CargoArt named the song one of her favourites on the album.

Track listing
Digital download
 "Always Be Yours" – 4:12

CD single
 "Always Be Yours" – 4:12
 "Live Louder" (live acoustic version) –

Weekly charts

Release history

References

2015 singles
2015 songs
Nathaniel Willemse songs
Songs written by David Musumeci
Songs written by Anthony Egizii
Song recordings produced by DNA Songs
Sony Music Australia singles